Cléon is a commune in the Seine-Maritime department in the Normandy region in northern France.

This city is known for its Renault factory, which manufactures engines and gearboxes.

Two Renault engines are named after the city, the Cléon-Fonte engine and the Cléon-Alu Engine. For collectors of vintage cars, the name "Cléon" refers primarily to these two engines.

Geography

Heraldry

Population

Places of interest
 The church of St.Martin, dating from the sixteenth century.
 A seventeenth century manorhouse.

See also
Communes of the Seine-Maritime department

References

Communes of Seine-Maritime